Gary Carl Hatfield is an American philosopher and  Adam Seybert Professor in Moral and Intellectual Philosophy at the University of Pennsylvania.  He is a specialist in the history of modern philosophy up to Kant, as well as philosophy of mind.

Education and career

Hatfield earned his Ph.D. from the University of Wisconsin, Madison in 1979.  He taught at Harvard University and Johns Hopkins University before joining the Penn faculty in 1987.

Books
 The Natural and the Normative: Theories of Spatial Perception from Kant to Helmholtz
 Perception and Cognition: Essays in the Philosophy of Psychology
 Evolution of Mind, Brain, and Culture

References

External links
 Gary Hatfield

21st-century American philosophers
Living people
Date of birth missing (living people)
University of Wisconsin–Madison alumni
University of Pennsylvania faculty
Year of birth missing (living people)